A Java KeyStore (JKS) is a repository of security certificates either authorization certificates or public key certificates plus corresponding private keys,  used for instance in TLS encryption.

In IBM WebSphere Application Server and Oracle WebLogic Server, a file with extension jks serves as a keystore.

The Java Development Kit maintains a CA keystore file named cacerts in folder jre/lib/security. JDKs provide a tool named keytool to manipulate the keystore. keytool has no functionality to extract the private key out of the keystore, but this is possible with third-party tools like jksExportKey, CERTivity, Portecle and KeyStore Explorer.

See also
Java Secure Socket Extension
Keyring (cryptography)
Public key infrastructure

References

External links
 Javadoc for KeyStore

Public-key cryptography
Java development tools